Year 1540 (MDXL) was a leap year starting on Thursday (link will display the full calendar) of the Julian calendar.

Events 
 January–June 
 January 6 – King Henry VIII marries Anne of Cleves, his fourth Queen consort; the marriage lasts six months.
 February 14 – Charles V, Holy Roman Emperor, enters Ghent without resistance, and executes rebels, ending the Revolt of Ghent (1539–1540).
 March 23 – Waltham Abbey is the last to be closed as part of Henry VIII of England's  dissolution of the monasteries.
 April – The English cathedral priories of Canterbury and Rochester are transformed into secular cathedral chapters, concluding the Dissolution of the Monasteries.
 May 17 – Battle of Kannauj: Sher Shah Suri defeats and deposes Mughal Emperor Humayan, establishing the Sur Empire.

 July–December 
 July 7 – Spanish conquistador Francisco Vázquez de Coronado captures Hawikuh in modern-day New Mexico, at this time known as part of Cíbola, but fails to find the legendary gold.
 July 9 – King Henry VIII of England divorces Anne of Cleves, his fourth Queen consort.
 July 28 – One of the most important political figures of the reign of Henry VIII of England, Thomas Cromwell, is executed on order from the king, on charges of treason. Henry marries his fifth wife, Catherine Howard, on the same day.
 August 15 – In Peru, Spanish captain Garcí Manuel de Carbajal founds the Villa Hermosa de Arequipa; one year later, Charles V of Germany and I of Spain will give the valley a status of 'city' by royal decree.
 September – Gibraltar is sacked by the fleet of Barbary pirate Ali Hamet, a Sardinian renegade in the service of the Ottoman Empire, and many of its leading citizens are taken as captives to Peñón de Vélez de la Gomera in Morocco. This leads to construction of the defensive Charles V Wall, at this time known as the Muralla de San Benito.
 September 3 – Gelawdewos succeeds his father Lebna Dengel as Emperor of Ethiopia.
 September 27 – The Society of Jesus (Jesuits) is approved by Pope Paul III, in his bull Regimini militantis Ecclesiae.
 October 1 – Battle of Alborán:  A Habsburg Spanish fleet, under the command of Bernardino de Mendoza, destroys an Ottoman fleet commanded by Ali Hamet off Alborán Island in the Mediterranean.
 October 18 – An expedition led by Spanish conquistador Hernando de Soto destroys the fortified village of Mabila in modern-day Alabama, killing paramount chief Tuskaloosa.

Date unknown
 Europe is hit by a heat wave and drought lasting for about seven months. Rivers such as the Rhine and Seine dry up, and many people die from dysentery and other illnesses, caused by lack of safe drinking water. However, this year's vintage from Würzburger Stein and other vineyards is particularly notable.
 Georg Joachim Rheticus publishes De libris revolutionum Copernici narratio prima in Danzig, an abstract of Copernicus' as yet unpublished De revolutionibus orbium coelestium, and the first printed publication of Copernican heliocentrism.
 Martin Luther expels theologian Caspar Schwenckfeld from Silesia.
 Paracelsus visits Villach.
 approximate date – The musket is introduced into Japan from Europe.

Births 

 January 18 – Catarina of Portugal, Duchess of Braganza, claimant to the Portuguese throne in 1580 (d. 1614)
 January 25 – Edmund Campion, English Jesuit and Roman Catholic martyr (d. 1581)
 January 28 – Ludolph van Ceulen, German mathematician (d. 1610)
 February 12 – Won Gyun, Korean general and admiral during the Joseon Dynasty (d. 1597)
 February 23 – Hedwig of Brandenburg, Duchess of Brunswick-Wolfenbüttel (d. 1602)
 February 25 – Henry Howard, 1st Earl of Northampton, English aristocrat and courtier (d. 1614)
 March 1 – Enrique de Guzmán, 2nd Count of Olivares, Spanish noble (d. 1607)
 March 17 – Bernhard VII, Prince of Anhalt-Zerbst, German prince of the House of Ascania (d. 1570)
 April 3 – Maria de' Medici, Italian noble (d. 1557)
 April 8 – Toyotomi Hidenaga, Japanese warlord (d. 1591)
 May 9 – Maharana Pratap, Indian warrior king (d. 1597)
 May 14
 Paolo Paruta, Italian historian (d. 1598)
 Bartholomäus Scultetus, German mayor of Görlitz, astronomer (d. 1614)
 May 22 – James, Duke of Rothesay, Scottish prince (d. 1541)
 May 31 – Henry Cheyne, 1st Baron Cheyne, English politician and baron (d. 1587)
 June 3 – Charles II, Archduke of Austria, regent of Inner Austria (d. 1590)
 June 9 – Shima Sakon, Japanese samurai (d. 1600)
 June 11 – Barnabe Googe, English poet (d. 1594)
 June 29 – Ana de Mendoza, Princess of Eboli, Spanish countess (d. 1592)
 June 30 – Countess Palatine Elisabeth of Simmern-Sponheim, Duchess of Saxony (d. 1594)
 July 7 – John Sigismund Zápolya, King of Hungary (d. 1571)
 July 11 – Adolf of Nassau, Count of Nassau, Dutch soldier (d. 1568)
 July 16 – Alfonso Carafa, Italian cardinal (d. 1565)
 July 19 – Ludowika Margaretha of Zweibrücken-Bitsch, spouse of Count Philip V of Hanau-Lichtenberg (d. 1569)
 August 4 – Sisto Fabri, Italian theologian (d. 1594)
 August 5 – Joseph Justus Scaliger, French Protestant scholar (d. 1609)
 August 25 – Lady Catherine Grey, English noblewoman, potential successor to the throne (d. 1568)
 September 5 – Magnus, Duke of Holstein, Prince of Denmark (d. 1583)
 September 9 – John VII, Count of Oldenburg (d. 1603)
 October 1 – Johann Jakob Grynaeus, Swiss Protestant clergyman (d. 1617)
 November 12 – Anna of Veldenz, Margrave of Baden (d. 1586)
 November 16 – Princess Cecilia of Sweden (d. 1627)
 December 8 – Giovanni Vincenzo Gonzaga, Italian Catholic cardinal (d. 1591)
 December 21 – Thomas Schweicker, German artist (d. 1602)
 December 28 – Charles I, Duke of Mecklenburg (d. 1610)
 December 31 – Silvio Antoniano, Italian Catholic cardinal (d. 1603)
 date unknown
 Andrea Andreani, Italian wood engraver (d. 1623)
 Francis Drake, English sea captain, privateer, navigator, slaver, pirate and politician (d. 1596)
 Christopher Hatton, English politician (d. 1591)
 George Hastings, 4th Earl of Huntingdon, English nobleman (d. 1604)
 Pierre Jeannin, French statesman (d. 1622)
 François Viète, French mathematician (d. 1603)
 Amago Yoshihisa, Japanese samurai and warlord (d. 1610)
 probable
 William Byrd, English composer (d. 1623)
 Bernardino de Mendoza, Spanish military commander (d. 1604)
 Paschal Baylon, Spanish friar (d. 1592)

Deaths 

 c. January – Elizabeth Blount, mistress of Henry VIII of England (b. 1502)
 January 27 – Angela Merici, Italian religious leader and saint (b. 1474)
 March 30 – Matthäus Lang von Wellenburg, German statesman and archbishop of Salzburg (b. 1469)
 April 21 – Afonso of Portugal, Catholic cardinal (b. 1509)
 May 6 – Juan Luís Vives, Spanish scholar (b. 1492)
 May 22 – Francesco Guicciardini, Italian statesman and historian (b. 1483)
 June 16 – Konrad von Thüngen, German noble (b. c. 1466)
 July 22 – John Zápolya, King of Hungary (b. c. 1490)
 July 28 – Thomas Cromwell, 1st Earl of Essex, English statesman (executed) (b. c.1485)
 July 30
 Thomas Abel, English priest (martyred) (b. c. 1497)
 Robert Barnes, English reformer (martyred) (b. 1495)
 Eric I, Duke of Brunswick-Lüneburg, Prince of Calenberg (1491–1540) (b. 1470)
 August 23 – Guillaume Budé, French scholar (b. 1467)
 August 24 – Girolamo Francesco Maria Mazzola (Parmigianino), Italian artist (b. 1503)
 August 28 – Federico II Gonzaga, Duke of Mantua (b. 1500)
 September 2 – Lebna Dengel, Emperor of Ethiopia (in battle) (b. 1501)
 September 16 – Enrique de Borja y Aragón, Spanish noble of the House of Borgia (b. 1518)
 September 20 – Infante Duarte, Duke of Guimarães, son of King Manuel I of Portugal (b. 1515)
 October 5 – Helius Eobanus Hessus, German Latin poet (b. 1488)
 date unknown – Francisco de Ulloa, Spanish explorer
 probable
 Tristão da Cunha, Portuguese explorer (b. 1460)
 Johann Georg Faust, German alchemist (b. 1480)

References